Hong Kong League Cup 2000–01 is the 1st staging of the Hong Kong League Cup.

The 8 teams in Hong Kong First Division League participated in the competition and Happy Valley won the first title of this competition by winning 2-1 against Sun Hei under golden goal rule. It received a HK$125,000 champion prize.

Format
The teams were drawn into 2 groups (4 teams in a group). Each team plays 2 matches against the other teams in its group. The top two teams in each group qualified for the semi-finals while the bottom two teams entered the 5th to 8th-place position matches.

Group stage

Group A

Group B

Knockout stage
All times are Hong Kong Time (UTC+8).

5th to 8th place position matches

Semi-finals

Seventh-place match

Fifth-place match

Third-place match

Final

Results

References

External links
 www.rsssf.com Hongkong 2000/01
  HKFA Website 聯賽盃回顧(一)

Hong Kong League Cup
League Cup
Hong Kong League Cup